Western France may refer to:

 Metropolitan France, the part of France in Europe
 West France (European Parliament constituency): Brittany, Pays de la Loire, and Poitou-Charentes

See also
 West Francia
 Geography of France